Raissa Yalibi (born 11 March 1992) is a Congolese handball player for HC Heritage and the DR Congo national team.

She represented DR Congo at the 2019 World Women's Handball Championship.

References

1992 births
Living people
Democratic Republic of the Congo female handball players